Stanley and Stella in: Breaking the Ice, also known as Love Found, is a 1987 American computer animated short film.

Synopsis 
Birds and fish are moving around different halves of a sphere, separated by a sheet of ice. One bird and one fish (Stanley and Stella) notice each other and approach their sides of the ice sheet. They look at each other through the ice and twirl to acknowledge that the feeling of love is mutual. Stella looks up and points, Stanley appears to be confused. Stella then taps her side of the ice sheet with her tail. Stanley gazes upward and then nods to her, understanding what he can do. As Stella watches, Stanley flies further and further up until he is high enough and then dives towards the ice sheet, breaking it.

Stella approaches Stanley, who appears to be unconscious, and nudges him awake. He looks around him to see that he is successful and Stella kisses his cheek. As they continue to gaze at each other, the birds and fish around them are shown freely mingling throughout the sphere.

History 
Created by Craig Reynolds and others at Symbolics Graphics Division in 1986, the film was intended to portray the capabilities of the boids artificial life program. It premiered at the Electronic Theater at SIGGRAPH '87 in which the original version was produced in association with Whitney / Demos Productions and features sound effects and somber music.

The film did not gain attention outside the computer graphic field until it was rescored by James Reynolds and edited into the direct to video compilation The Mind's Eye in 1990. In this compilation, the film was retitled as "Love Found", featured a new jazz score, and the credits were eliminated. This version of the film later aired numerous times in the early 1990s on the Canadian television station YTV as part of the "Short Circutz" interludes. Much of Stanley and Stella was later incorporated into a music video, which can still be seen occasionally on MTV, as well as being featured in a few segments of Club Mario.

References

External links 
 
 Film on YouTube

1987 films
1987 short films
Computer-animated short films
American animated short films
1987 animated films
1980s American animated films